Maze is an album by Japanese rock band Nothing's Carved in Stone released on May 16, 2015. The album peaked at number eight on the Oricon charts.

Track listing

References

2015 albums
Nothing's Carved in Stone albums